Hibernian Football Club, commonly known as Hibs, is a professional football club based in the Leith area of Edinburgh, Scotland. The club plays in the Scottish Premiership, the top tier of the Scottish Professional Football League (SPFL). The club was founded in 1875 by members of Edinburgh's Irish community, and named after the Roman word for Ireland. Nowadays, while the Irish heritage of Hibernian is still reflected in the name, colours and badge, support for the club is now based more on geography than ethnicity or religion. Their local rivals are Heart of Midlothian, with whom they contest the Edinburgh derby.

Home matches are played at Easter Road, which has been in use since 1893, when the club joined the Scottish Football League. The name of the club is regularly shortened to Hibs, with the team also being known as The Hibees (pronounced ) and supporters known as Hibbies. Another nickname is The Cabbage, derived from the shortened rhyming slang for Hibs ("Cabbage and Ribs").

Hibernian have won the Scottish league championship four times, most recently in 1952. Three of those four championships were won between 1948 and 1952, when the club had the services of The Famous Five, a notable forward line. The club have won the Scottish Cup three times, in 1887, 1902, and 2016, with the latter victory ending a notorious drought. Hibs have also won the Scottish League Cup three times, in 1972, 1991, and 2007. Hibernian reached the semi-final of the first ever European Cup in 1955–56, becoming the first British side to participate in European competition; they reached the same stage of the Inter-Cities Fairs Cup in 1960–61.

History

Foundation and early history (1875–1939)

The club was founded in 1875 by Irishmen living in the Cowgate area of Edinburgh. The name Hibernian (deriving from Hibernia, an ancient name for Ireland), the colour green, the Gaelic harp and the Irish language phrase Erin Go Bragh (meaning Ireland Forever) were adopted as symbols early on. Founder Fr. Edward Joseph Hannan was the first president of the club and Michael Whelahan its first team captain. James Connolly, the famous socialist and Irish Republican leader, was a Hibs fan, while the club were "closely identified" with the Irish Home Rule Movement during the 1880s. There was some sectarian resistance initially to an Irish club participating in Scottish football, but Hibs established themselves as a force in Scottish football in the 1880s. Hibs were the first club from the east coast of Scotland to win a major trophy, the 1887 Scottish Cup. They went on to defeat Preston North End, who had reached the semi-finals of the 1887 FA Cup, in a friendly match described as the Association Football Championship of the World Decider.

Mismanagement over the next few years led to Hibs becoming homeless and the club temporarily ceased operating in 1891. A lease on the Easter Road site was acquired in late 1892 and Hibs played its first match at Easter Road on 4 February 1893. Despite this interruption, the club today views the period since 1875 as one continued history and therefore counts the honours won between 1875 and 1891, including the 1887 Scottish Cup. The club were admitted to the Scottish Football League in 1893, although they had to win the Second Division twice before being elected into the First Division in 1895.

A significant change at this time was that players were no longer required to be members of the Catholic Young Men's Society. Hibs are not seen today as being an Irish or Roman Catholic institution, as it was in the early years of its history. For instance, the Irish harp was only re-introduced to the club badge when it was last re-designed in 2000. This design reflects the three pillars of the club's identity: Ireland, Edinburgh (the castle) and Leith (the ship). Geography rather than ethnicity or religion is now seen as the primary reason for supporting Hibs, who draw most of their support from the north and east of Edinburgh.

Hibs had some success after being reformed, winning the 1902 Scottish Cup and their first league championship a year later. After this, however, the club endured a long barren spell. The club lost its placing in the league, and were relegated for the first time in 1931, although they were promoted back to the top division two years later. The notorious Scottish Cup drought began as they reached three cup finals, two in consecutive years, but lost each of them.

The Famous Five (1939–1959)

Hibs' most successful era was in the decade following the end of the Second World War, when it was "among the foremost clubs in Britain". The forward line of Gordon Smith, Bobby Johnstone, Lawrie Reilly, Eddie Turnbull and Willie Ormond, collectively known as the Famous Five, was "regarded as the finest ever seen in Scottish football". Each of the Famous Five scored more than 100 goals for Hibs. The north stand at Easter Road is now named in their honour. Smith was signed by Hibs in 1941, while Ormond, Turnbull, Reilly and Johnstone were all signed during 1946. Of the five, only Ormond cost Hibs a transfer fee, £1200 from Stenhousemuir. Reilly, Johnstone, Smith and Turnbull were all signed from youth or junior leagues.

In the first season of competitive football after the Second World War, Hibs reached the 1947 Scottish Cup Final. They took an early lead in the match, but went on to lose 2–1 to Aberdeen. With Reilly added to the first team in 1947–48, Hibs won the Scottish league championship for the first time since 1903. This was achieved despite the death of team manager Willie McCartney in January 1948. McCartney was succeeded by Hugh Shaw, who added Johnstone to the first team during 1948. Hibs finished third in the league in 1948–49. In a friendly match against Nithsdale Wanderers on 21 April 1949, Hibs included all of the famous five players in the same team for the first time. They then made their collective competitive debut on 15 October 1949, in a 2–0 win against Queen of the South. They improved on their season from the year before, by finishing second in the league to Rangers by one point.

1950–51 was the high point of the Famous Five era. With other internationalists such as Tommy Younger and Bobby Combe, Hibs won the league by 10 points (when two points were awarded for each win). They reached the 1950 Scottish League Cup Final. Turnbull had scored a hattrick in the semi-final but was unavailable for the final. Jimmy Bradley started at left wing with Ormond moved to inside left. Motherwell beat them 3–0. Hibs retained the league championship in 1951–52, this time winning by four points. Hibs were narrowly denied a third consecutive title in 1952–53 on the last day of the season. A late Rangers equaliser against Queen of the South took the title to Ibrox on goal average. The Famous Five forward line remained in place until March 1955, when Johnstone was sold to Manchester City.

Despite only finishing fifth in the Scottish League in 1955, Hibs were invited to participate in the first season of the European Cup, which was not strictly based on league positions at that time. Eighteen clubs who were thought would generate interest across Europe and who also had the floodlights necessary to play games at night, were invited to participate. Floodlights had been used at Easter Road for the first time in a friendly match against Hearts on 18 October 1954. Hibs became the first British club in Europe because the Football League secretary Alan Hardaker persuaded Chelsea, the English champions, not to enter.

Hibs played their first tie against Rot-Weiss Essen, winning 4–0 in the Georg-Melches-Stadion and drawing 1–1 at Easter Road. They defeated Djurgårdens IF to reach the semi-final, but in that tie they were defeated 3–0 on aggregate by Stade Reims, who had the famous France international player Raymond Kopa in their side. Reims lost 4–3 to Real Madrid in the final.

Turnbull's Tornadoes (1960–1989)
Hibs frequently participated in the Fairs Cup during the 1960s, winning ties against Barcelona and Napoli. However, the club achieved little domestically until former player Eddie Turnbull was persuaded to return to Easter Road as manager in 1971. The team, popularly known as Turnbull's Tornadoes, finished second in the league in 1974 and 1975, and won the League Cup in 1972. The club also won the Drybrough Cup in 1972 and 1973, and recorded a 7–0 win over Edinburgh derby rivals Hearts at Tynecastle on 1 January 1973.

Performances went into decline after the mid-1970s, as Hibs were replaced by the New Firm of Aberdeen and Dundee United as the main challengers to the Old Firm. Turnbull resigned as manager and Hibs were relegated, for the second time in their history, in 1980. They were immediately promoted back to the Scottish Premier Division in 1981, but the club struggled during the 1980s, failing to qualify for European competition until 1989.

1990s: Attempted takeover by Hearts
After mismanagement during the late 1980s, Hibs were on the brink of financial ruin in 1990. Wallace Mercer, the chairman of Hearts, proposed a merger of the two clubs, but the Hibs fans believed that the proposal was more like a hostile takeover. They formed the Hands off Hibs group to campaign for the continued existence of the club. This succeeded when a prominent local businessman, Kwik-Fit owner Sir Tom Farmer, acquired a controlling interest in Hibs. The fans were able to persuade Farmer to take control despite the fact that he had no great interest in football. Farmer was persuaded in part by the fact that a relative of his had been involved in the rescue of Hibs from financial ruin in the early 1890s. After the attempted takeover by Mercer, Hibs had a few good years in the early 1990s, winning the 1991 Scottish League Cup Final and finishing in the top five in the league in 1993, 1994 and 1995. Soon after Alex McLeish was appointed as manager in 1998, Hibs were relegated to the First Division, but immediately won promotion back to the SPL in 1999.

2000s: "Golden generation"
Hibs enjoyed a good season in 2000–01 as they finished third in the league and reached the 2001 Scottish Cup Final, which was lost 3–0 to Celtic. Manager Alex McLeish departed for Rangers in December 2001; team captain Franck Sauzée was appointed as the new manager, despite the fact that he had no previous coaching experience. A terrible run of form followed and Sauzée was fired after being in charge for 69 days.

Kilmarnock manager Bobby Williamson was then hired, but he proved to be unpopular with Hibs supporters. However, a "golden generation" of exciting young players emerged, including Garry O'Connor, Derek Riordan, Kevin Thomson and Scott Brown. These players featured heavily as Hibs eliminated both halves of the Old Firm to reach the 2004 Scottish League Cup Final, only to lose 2–0 to Livingston. Williamson departed near the end of that season to manage Plymouth Argyle and was replaced by Tony Mowbray. Hibs finished third in his first season as manager, while Mowbray won the SFWA Manager of the Year award.

Mowbray left Hibs in October 2006 to manage West Bromwich Albion, and was replaced by former player John Collins. The team won the 2007 Scottish League Cup Final under his management, but the club sold Kevin Thomson, Scott Brown and Steven Whittaker for fees totalling more than £8 million. Collins resigned later that year, frustrated by the lack of funds provided to sign new players. Former Hibs player Mixu Paatelainen was hired to replace Collins, but he left after the end of his first full season.

Another former Hibernian player, John Hughes, was soon appointed in place of Paatelainen. Hughes, who made high-profile signings such as Anthony Stokes and Liam Miller, led Hibs to a good start to the 2009–10 season.

2010s: Scottish Cup success
Hibs finished fourth in 2010 and qualified for the Europa League, but a poor start to the 2010–11 season led to John Hughes leaving the club. Hughes was replaced by Colin Calderwood, who was himself sacked a year later. The club avoided relegation in 2011–12 and reached the 2012 Scottish Cup Final under new manager Pat Fenlon, but this was lost 5–1 to Hearts. Fenlon largely rebuilt the team after this defeat. This resulted in an improved league position in 2012–13 and the team reaching the 2013 Scottish Cup Final, which was lost 3–0 to league champions Celtic. Hibs qualified for the 2013–14 UEFA Europa League, but they suffered a Scottish record defeat in European competition (9–0 on aggregate against Malmö). Fenlon resigned on 1 November and was replaced by Terry Butcher. A run of 13 games without a win to finish the 2013–14 Scottish Premiership season meant that Hibs fell into a relegation play-off, which was lost after a penalty shootout against Hamilton Academical.

Butcher was sacked in June and was replaced by Alan Stubbs. He was unable to lead the team to promotion, but the 2015–16 season saw considerable cup success. The team reached the League Cup final, which was lost to Ross County. This was followed by victory in the Scottish Cup for the first time since 1902, culminating in a cup final win against Rangers. Soon after the cup win, Stubbs resigned as Hibs manager to take charge at Rotherham United and was replaced by Neil Lennon, who led the team to promotion by winning the 2016–17 Scottish Championship. In their first season back in the top flight, Hibs finished fourth in the Premiership and qualified for the Europa League. Lennon left the club in January 2019 and was replaced by Paul Heckingbottom, who only held the post for seven months. Jack Ross was appointed on 15 November 2019.

2020s: Managerial turnover
Hibs finished seventh in a 2019–20 league season that was curtailed by the COVID-19 pandemic. In the following season they finished third in the league and reached the 2021 Scottish Cup Final, but this was lost 1–0 to St Johnstone. Ross guided Hibs to the League Cup final later that year, but was sacked 10 days before the final after a run of seven defeats in nine league games. Shaun Maloney was appointed as manager in December 2021, but was himself sacked four months later, having won six games out of nineteen. His successor, Lee Johnson, was appointed manager on 19 May 2022.

Colours and badge
The predominant club colours are green and white, which have been used since the formation of the club in 1875. The strip typically has a green body, white sleeves, and a white collar. The shorts are normally white, although green has been used in recent seasons. The socks are green, usually with some white detail. Hibs have used yellow, purple, black, white, and a dark green in recent seasons for their alternate kits. In 1977, Hibs became the first club in Scotland to bear sponsorship on their shirts. This arrangement prompted television companies to threaten a boycott of Hibs games if they used the sponsored kit, which resulted in the club using an alternate kit for the first time.

Hibs wore green and white hooped shirts during the 1870s, which was the inspiration for the style later adopted by Celtic. Hibs then wore all-green shirts from 1879 until 1938, when white sleeves were added to the shirts. This was similar in style to Arsenal, who had added white sleeves to their red shirts earlier in the 1930s. The colour of the shorts was changed to a green which matched the shirts in 2004, to celebrate the fortieth anniversary of a friendly win in October 1964 against Real Madrid. Green shorts were used in that match to avoid a colour clash with the all-white colours of Real Madrid. Hibs also used green shorts in the 2006–07, 2007–08 and 2008–09 seasons. For the 2012–13 season, Hibs changed the primary colour of the shirts to a darker "bottle" green, instead of the normal emerald green. A darker green had been used until the 1930s. For the 2014–15 season, Hibs removed the traditional white sleeves from their home kit, as they changed to a darker green shirt in commemoration of the Famous Five forward line.

The badge used to identify the club has changed frequently over the years, which has reflected an ongoing debate about its identity. This debate has centred on whether its Irish heritage should be proudly displayed, or ignored for fear of being accused of sectarianism. The Irish harp was first removed in the 1950s, then re-introduced to the club badge when it was last re-designed in 2000. Scottish Football Museum director Ged O'Brien said in 2001, that the current design shows that Hibs "are comfortable with all the strands of their tradition – it has Leith, Edinburgh and Ireland in it." As well as the harp representing Ireland, the present badge includes a ship (for the port of Leith) and a castle (as in Edinburgh Castle).

Stadium

Hibs played on The Meadows for the first two years of their history, before moving to grounds in Newington (Mayfield Park) and Bonnington Road, Leith (Powderhall), in different spells between 1877 and 1879. After the lease on Mayfield Park expired, Hibs moved to a ground known as Hibernian Park, on what is now Bothwell Street in Leith. Hibs failed to secure the ground lease and a builder started constructing houses on the site in 1890. Hibs obtained a lease on a site that is now known as Easter Road in 1892 and have played their home matches there since February 1893.

Before the Taylor Report demanded that the stadium be all-seated, Easter Road had vast banks of terracing on three sides, which meant that it could hold crowds in excess of 60,000. The record attendance of 65,860, which is also a record for a football match played in Edinburgh, was set by an Edinburgh derby played on 2 January 1950. Such vast crowds were drawn by the success of the Famous Five.

The pitch was noted for its pronounced slope, but this was removed in 2000. Easter Road is a modern stadium, with all four of its stands having been built since 1995. The most recent redevelopment was the construction of a new East Stand in 2010.

Scotland have played seven of their home matches at Easter Road, between 1998 and 2017. Scotland women played their first match at Easter Road in August 2019, a Euro 2021 qualifying match against Cyprus. The ground has hosted one international not involving the Scotland teams, a friendly played between Ghana and South Korea preceding the 2006 FIFA World Cup. Easter Road has also sometimes been used as a neutral venue for Scottish League Cup semi-final matches and once hosted a Scottish Challenge Cup final.

Rivalry

Hibs have a traditional local rivalry in Edinburgh with Hearts; the derby match between the two clubs is one of the oldest rivalries in world football. Graham Spiers has described it as "one of the jewels of the Scottish game". The clubs first met on Christmas Day 1875, when Hearts won 1–0 in the first match ever contested by Hibs. The two clubs became distinguished in Edinburgh after a five-game struggle for the Edinburgh Football Association Cup in 1878, which Hearts finally won with a 3–2 victory after four successive draws. The clubs have met each other in two Scottish Cup finals, in 1896 and 2012, both of which were won by Hearts. The 1896 match is also notable for being the only Scottish Cup Final to be played outside Glasgow.

Both clubs have been champions of Scotland four times, although Hearts have the better record in derby matches. Hibs recorded the biggest derby win in a competitive match when they won 7–0 at Tynecastle on New Year's Day 1973. While it has been noted that religious background lies behind the rivalry, that aspect is "muted" and is a "pale reflection" of the sectarianism in Glasgow. Although the clubs are inescapable rivals, the rivalry is mainly "good-natured" and has had beneficial effects.

Supporters and culture

Hibernian are one of only two full-time professional football clubs in Edinburgh, which is the capital of and second largest city in Scotland. The club had the fourth largest average attendance in the Scottish leagues during the 2019–20 season (16,728). In the period after the Second World War, Hibs attracted average attendances in excess of 20,000, peaking at 31,567 in the 1951–52 season. Since Easter Road was redeveloped into an all-seater stadium in the mid-1990s, average attendance has varied between a high of 18,124 in 2017–18 and a low of 9,150 in 2003–04. There has been a significant increase in recent seasons, inspired by the Scottish Cup victory in 2016 and promotion in 2017. In the 1980s and 1990s, a minority of the club's supporters had a reputation as one of Britain's most prominent casuals groups, known as the Capital City Service.

Literature
The works of author Irvine Welsh, particularly Trainspotting, contain several references to Hibernian. The team is often mentioned in casual conversation and is the team many of his characters support. Visual references to Hibs are noticeable in Danny Boyle's film adaptation of Trainspotting; Francis Begbie wears a Hibs shirt while he plays five-a-side football, while many Hibs posters and pictures can be seen on the walls of Mark Renton's bedroom.

In the final short story of Welsh's The Acid House, Coco Bryce, a boy from the "Hibs firm"   Capital City Service, is struck by lightning while under the influence of LSD in a Pilton park. His soul is then transferred to the body of an unborn child from one of the more affluent areas of Edinburgh. The appearances by Hibs in the 2012 and 2016 Scottish Cup finals are described in Welsh's novels A Decent Ride and Dead Men's Trousers respectively.

Hibernian are also frequently referred to in the Inspector Rebus series of detective novels by Ian Rankin. Rankin has stated that Rebus is a Raith Rovers supporter but he is a Hibs fan in the 2000s television adaptation of the series. Ironically, that version of Rebus is played by a Hearts supporter, Ken Stott. DS Siobhan Clarke, his colleague in the later books, is a "loyal supporter" of Hibs.

Music
The Hibs anthem "Glory, Glory to the Hibees" was written and performed by the Scottish comedian, Hector Nicol. Former Marillion singer Fish is a Hibs fan; Easter Road is mentioned in the song "Lucky", from the album Internal Exile. The Proclaimers are lifelong Hibs fans, and were heavily involved with the 'Hands off Hibs' campaign to save the club in 1990. Sunshine on Leith has become a Hibs anthem, which is traditionally played after big victories at Easter Road and the finals of cup competitions. In their song "Cap in Hand", from the Sunshine on Leith album, The Proclaimers make a reference to the Hibs player Andy Goram:

The song "Joyful Kilmarnock Blues", from the first album released by The Proclaimers, is about a Hibs victory away from home.

Ownership and finances
Although the football club was formed in 1875, it was not incorporated until 1903. The club remained a private company until 1988, when it was publicly listed on the London Stock Exchange. This public listing, combined with poor financial performance, made Hibs vulnerable to an attempted takeover in 1990 by Hearts chairman Wallace Mercer. This attempt was averted when Mercer was unable to acquire the 75% shareholding needed to liquidate the company. The club's parent company, Forth Investments plc, entered receivership in 1991 and Sir Tom Farmer acquired control of the club from the receiver for £3 million. Farmer funded redevelopments of Easter Road and financial losses made by Hibs, although he delegated control to other figures such as Rod Petrie.

In December 2014, the club said it intended to sell up to 51% ownership of the club to its supporters. By November 2017, supporters had increased their shareholding in the club to 34%. The majority ownership of the club was sold in July 2019 to Peruvian-born US-based businessman Ronald Gordon, who became the executive chairman. On 21 February 2023 Hibernian announced that Gordon had died after a battle with cancer at the age of 68.

Players

First team squad

On loan

Academy squads

Women's team

The club that became the Hibernian women's team was first founded in 1997 by Iain Johnston and Paul Johnston, but for the initial two seasons of its existence the club was under the auspices of Preston Athletic. The name changed to Hibernian Ladies in 1999 and they became one of the leading women's teams in Scotland.

Hibernian won the Women's Scottish Cup in 2010, for the fifth time in eight years. Their success in the national cup competition was contrasted to the male affiliate, who went over a century without winning the equivalent competition until their victory in 2016. Hibernian Ladies won domestic cup doubles in 2016, 2017 and 2018.

Ahead of the 2020 season, the club was rebranded as Hibernian Women and players were offered their first part-time professional contracts. The women's first team was fully integrated into the men's club in July 2022, with the youth sides still being run by the Hibernian Community Foundation.

Club officials

First team coaching staff

Board of directors

Backroom staff

Noted players

Lewis Stevenson holds the record for most league appearances for Hibs, passing 450 in 2023, taking the place of Arthur Duncan who made 446. All of the Famous Five – Gordon Smith, Eddie Turnbull, Lawrie Reilly, Bobby Johnstone and Willie Ormond – scored more than 100 league goals for Hibs.

Hibernian players have been capped at full international level for 26 different national teams, with 67 Hibernian players appearing for Scotland. Hibernian rank fifth amongst all clubs in providing players for Scotland, behind the Old Firm, Queen's Park and Hearts. James Lundie and James McGhee were the first Hibs players to play for Scotland, in an 1886 British Home Championship match against Wales. Lawrie Reilly holds the record for most international caps earned while a Hibs player, making 38 appearances for Scotland between 1949 and 1957. In 1959, Hibs forward Joe Baker became the first player who had not previously played for an English club to win a cap for England.

To mark the club's 135th birthday, the club created a Hall of Fame in 2010. The first group of nominees, including 13 former players, were inducted at a dinner later that year.

Noted managers

From 1875 until 1903, Hibs were managed by a committee, although Dan McMichael, who also acted as treasurer, secretary and physiotherapist, was effectively the manager when the club won the 1902 Scottish Cup and the 1903 league championship. Willie McCartney took charge of part of the league-winning 1947–48 season, but he collapsed and died after a Scottish Cup match in January 1948. Hugh Shaw inherited that team, and went on to win three league championships in the late 1940s and early 1950s. Alan Stubbs won the Scottish Cup in 2015–16, ending a 114-year drought in that competition. Eddie Turnbull, Alex Miller and John Collins all won one Scottish League Cup each. Bobby Templeton, Bertie Auld, Alex McLeish and Neil Lennon all won second tier championships.

Honours

Major honours

Scottish league, first tier
Winners (4): 1902–03, 1947–48, 1950–51, 1951–52
Runners-up (6): 1896–97, 1946–47, 1949–50, 1952–53, 1973–74, 1974–75
Scottish Cup
Winners (3): 1886–87, 1901–02, 2015–16
Runners-up (12): 1895–96, 1913–14, 1922–23, 1923–24, 1946–47, 1957–58, 1971–72, 1978–79, 2000–01, 2011–12, 2012–13, 2020–21
Scottish League Cup
Winners (3): 1972–73, 1991–92, 2006–07
Runners-up (8): 1950–51, 1968–69, 1974–75, 1985–86, 1993–94, 2003–04, 2015–16, 2021–22

Other honours
Scottish league, second tier: 1893–94, 1894–95, 1932–33, 1980–81, 1998–99, 2016–17
Drybrough Cup: 1972, 1973
Summer Cup: 1941, 1964
Southern League Cup: 1943–44
East of Scotland Shield: 49 times
Rosebery Charity Cup: 22 times
Wilson Cup: 14 times
Glasgow Merchants Charity Cup: 1902
Edinburgh Football League: 1901–02
North-Eastern Cup: 1910–11
Dunedin Cup: 1921, 1929

UEFA ranking

Records

Attendance
Highest single game attendance: 65,860 vs Hearts, 2 January 1950
Highest average home attendance: 31,567 in the 1951–52 season
Highest attendance for any match involving Hibs: 143,570 vs Rangers at Hampden Park, 27 March 1948

Single game
Biggest victory: 22–1 vs Black Watch Highlanders, 3 September 1881
Biggest competitive victory: 15–1 vs Peebles Rovers, 11 February 1961
Biggest league victory: 11–1 vs Airdrie, 24 October 1959 and vs Hamilton, 6 November 1965
Biggest defeat: 0–10 vs Rangers, 24 December 1898

Caps and appearances

Most competitive appearances: Gordon Smith, 636
Most league appearances: Lewis Stevenson, 450
Most capped player: Lawrie Reilly, 38 for Scotland

Goals
Most competitive goals: Gordon Smith, 303
Most league goals: Lawrie Reilly, 187
Most competitive goals in a season: Joe Baker, 46 in 1959–60
Most league goals in a season: Joe Baker, 42 in 1959–60

Transfers
Record fee paid: Undisclosed fee for Martin Boyle to Al Faisaly in 2022
Record fee received: £4,400,000 for Scott Brown from Celtic in 2007

See also

Hibernian F.C. in European football
Hibernian W.F.C.
Hibernian F.C. Reserves and Academy
Hibernian Training Centre

Notes

References

Sources

External links

 
Football clubs in Scotland
Association football clubs established in 1875
Football clubs in Edinburgh
United Soccer Association imported teams
Leith
Scottish Premier League teams
1875 establishments in Scotland
Scottish Football League teams
Scottish Cup winners
East of Scotland Football League teams
Irish diaspora sports clubs in Scotland
Scottish Professional Football League teams
Scottish League Cup winners